Cult of the Holy War is the second and final album by Canadian Rock Against Communism band RAHOWA. The album was released in 1995 on lead singer George Eric Hawthorne's Resistance Records label. It was reissued in 2001 on vinyl by Showdown Records. The album marked the shift from the predecessor's Oi! and hard rock roots towards gothic metal with elements of neoclassical and neofolk music. It also experimented with a National Socialist black metal sound. In an interview with dis-Emi-A, Hawthorne cites Danzig, Morbid Angel, Moonspell, Type O Negative, Laibach, Death in June, Blood Axis, Sol Invictus, Bach, Beethoven, Mozart, Poledouris, Wagner, and Nietzsche as influences for the album. It was reissued on vinyl by Resistance in 2017.

Despite being by a white supremacist band, the album received coverage from some of the press outside white nationalist organizations, including The Black Flame: International Forum of the Church of Satan.

Track list 

Track 88 is a recording of George Eric Hawthorne giving a speech printed in the liner notes, following 74 tracks of silence, all 0:01 in length. The Showdown vinyl issue does not contain "Ode to a Dying People" or this track.

Track 13 was covered by Saga. As well as the tracks listed here, two more tracks, "The Rain Will Come Again" and "Final Call" were recorded during these sessions. They didn't appear on the final album, but appeared on the White Pride World Wide Volume 3 compilation the following year and were later reissued as a 7" single in 2010.

The ending chords of "Hall of the Heroes" bear significant resemblance to the Doors' "End of the Night".

"The Snow Fell" appeared on two compilations of mainstream metal music in 1995, including the Foundations Forum's official sampler disc for that year's event.

Personnel
George Eric Hawthorne – lead vocals, backing vocals, guitar, producer
Jon Latvis – lead guitar, keyboards, piano, backing vocals, bass, cello, producer
Graham Stolz – rhythm guitar
Carl Alexander – keyboards
Wolfgang Mortuus – drums
Corrado – engineer, producer

References

External links 
 Cult of the Holy War at Discogs (list of versions)
 Cult of the Holy War at Encyclopedia Metallum

1995 albums
Gothic rock albums by Canadian artists